Yowalga Land District is a land district (cadastral division) of Western Australia, located within the Eastern Land Division in the Great Victoria Desert, north of the Nullarbor Plain. It spans roughly 26°50'S - 29°00'S in latitude and 125°00'E - 129°00'E in longitude.

History
The district was created on 3 February 1932, and was defined in the Government Gazette:

References

Land districts of Western Australia
Goldfields-Esperance